Vasyl Yeremenko (: Vasili/Vassily Eremenko, born 10 May 1973) is a Ukrainian former competitive figure skater. He is the 1991 World Junior champion and 1991 Skate Canada International silver medalist for the Soviet Union. In 1992, he began representing Ukraine. Valentyn Nikolayev and Georgy Starkov coached him in Odessa.

Results

References

Navigation

1973 births
Ukrainian male single skaters
Soviet male single skaters
Living people
World Junior Figure Skating Championships medalists
Sportspeople from Odesa